Alberta Hospitalization Benefits describes health law for the province of Alberta, Canada. Chapter 3, of the Hospitals Act, is the Hospitalization Benefits Plan, of the province of Alberta. Origins include the 1919 Municipal Hospitals Act, national Health Services Act of 1944, and the provincial Lloydminster Hospital Act of 1947.

Amongst other things the Law defines:
 Insured services
 Entitlement to insured services
 Recovery of cost of services
 Payment for insured services
 Operating costs
 Debentures
 Group contracts
 Agreements
 Use of word "hospital"

References

External links 
 "Public Health Act", of the Government of Alberta.  - November 1, 2010.   Alberta Queen's Printer copyright item $7. Retrieved March 19, 2007.  
 "Hospitalization Benefits Regulation", of the Government of Alberta, 1973 - 1990 - 2005 - 2008.  Copyright item $4. Retrieved March 19, 2007. 
"Canada Health Act Overview", News Release by Health Canada,  November 25, 2002. Retrieved March 19, 2007.
"Canada Health Act Annual Report 2002-2003 (PDF Version - 1,873KB)", Annual Report by Health Canada, December, 2003. Retrieved January 19, 2011.

Alberta provincial legislation
Health law in Canada
Health in Alberta